Dark Champions is a game published by Hero Games using its Hero System rules to simulate the action-adventure genre. It has not been adapted for the 6th edition HERO rules introduced in 2009.

History
Steven S. Long authored the Champions subgenre book Dark Champions (1993), along with several sourcebooks to support it. Hero Games later released a standalone modern action game called Dark Champions (2004). There were only a few releases for this version of Dark Champions, the last of which was Dark Champions: The Animated Series (2005), the first subgenre book from the new Hero Games company.

Contents
When the original Dark Champions book was published in the early 1990s, its focus was on dark vigilantes in a superhero or almost-superhero setting, focusing on adventures similar to those of Batman, the Punisher, and others. The edition provoked some controversy upon its release because of an emphasis on The Harbinger of Justice, an extraordinarily powerful and murderous vigilante who was the setting's signature character.

The second edition, published in 2004, emphasizes general action-adventure scenarios such as one might find in the adventures of James Bond, Lara Croft, The A-Team, the Die Hard and Lethal Weapon movies, and so forth, though costumed vigilantes are still considered a subgenre (given detail in a supplement, Dark Champions: The Animated Series). Harbinger still appears but is somewhat de-emphasized.

Dark Champions also introduced the Hudson City campaign setting, which has been expanded with further supplements.

Reviews
Challenge #75 (1994)
White Wolf #37 (July/Aug., 1993)
Review in Shadis #9
Pyramid

References

Alternate history role-playing games
Campaign settings
Contemporary role-playing games
Hero System
Role-playing games introduced in 1993
Superhero role-playing games
Year of introduction missing